The year 1997 is the 1st year in the history of the Pride Fighting Championships, a mixed martial arts promotion based in Japan. 1997 had only 1 event, Pride 1.

Debut Pride FC fighters

Given that this is Pride FC's debut year, all fighters are also participating in their debut Pride FC fight.

 Akira Shoji
 Branko Cikatic
 Dan Severn
 Gary Goodridge
 John Dixson

 Kazunari Murakami
 Kimo Leopoldo
 Koji Kitao
 Nathan Jones 
 Nobuhiko Takada

 Oleg Taktarov
 Ralph White
 Renzo Gracie
 Rickson Gracie

Events list

Pride 1

Pride 1 was an inaugural event held on October 11, 1997, at The Tokyo Dome in Tokyo, Japan.

In addition to the MMA bouts, there was one kickboxing bout between K-1 Grand Prix Champion Branko Cikatić and Ralph White. The English language commentary for this event was provided by Stephen Quadros and Bas Rutten.

Results

See also
 Pride Fighting Championships
 List of Pride Fighting Championships champions
 List of Pride Fighting events

References

Pride Fighting Championships events
1997 in mixed martial arts